Kimitoön is a municipality and island of Finland. It was created on 1 January 2009, when the municipalities of Dragsfjärd, Kimito and Västanfjärd were consolidated into a single municipality.

The municipality is located in the Archipelago Sea in the Southwest Finland region. It is situated in the Southwest Finland region in Western Finland province. The island has a population of 7,500 divided between the two municipalities: Kimitoön and Salo of which Salo is mostly located on the mainland. Kimitoön is bilingual with the majority speaking Swedish and a minority Finnish as their native language.

Politics
Results of the 2015 Finnish parliamentary election in Kimitoön:

Swedish People's Party  49.6%                                     
Social Democratic Party  13.0%
Left Alliance  9.7%
True Finns  6.7%
Centre Party  10.4%
National Coalition Party  5.4%
Green League  3.8%
Christian Democrats  0.8%
Other parties  0.6%

Gallery

See also
 Fasta Åland
 Hailuoto

References

External links

 Municipality of Kimitoön – Official website 

 
Finnish islands in the Baltic
Populated coastal places in Finland
Populated places established in 2009